Allenwood is a hamlet in the City of Carlisle district, in the county of Cumbria, England.

Nearby settlements 
Nearby settlements include the villages of Warwick Bridge and Heads Nook.

References  

 A-Z Carlisle (page 20)

Hamlets in Cumbria
Wetheral